Hans Hilding Hønsvall (born 29 February 1952) is a Norwegian politician for the Christian Democratic Party.

He served as a deputy representative to the Norwegian Parliament from Vestfold during the term 2001–2005.

On the local level Hønsvall is the mayor of Andebu municipality since 1999.

References

1952 births
Living people
Deputy members of the Storting
Christian Democratic Party (Norway) politicians
Mayors of places in Vestfold
Place of birth missing (living people)
21st-century Norwegian politicians